Oceana is a major unincorporated community within Virginia Beach, Virginia, United States. Adjacent to Oceana is the Naval Air Station Oceana. The community is centered at the intersection of Virginia Beach Boulevard and First Colonial Road. Oceana is also located in close proximity to the Atlantic Park and Seatack neighborhoods of Virginia Beach.
 

Communities in Virginia Beach, Virginia